Julia A. Stewart (born August 4, 1955) is an American businesswoman and former chief executive of Dine Brands Global, America's largest casual dining company. As of June 2019, Stewart serves as an independent director on the board of Avery Dennison.

Career 
In 1971, Stewart, when she was 16 years old, started working for International House of Pancakes (IHOP) as a waitress.

After college and before returning to IHOP in 2001, she was president of Applebee's domestic division.

Dine Brands Global was formed as "DineEquity" in 2007, when Stewart led IHOP to take over the larger Applebee's for US$1.9 billion and debt. Prior to the takeover, Stewart had led IHOP through 18 consecutive quarters of growth, by moving over to a primarily franchise-driven business model.

Stewart resigned the position of chief executive officer with DineEquity in February, 2017.

Achievements 
In 2006, Stewart ranked 49 on the Fortune magazine list of the 50 Most Powerful Women

References

1955 births
Living people
American women chief executives
American chief executives of food industry companies
Place of birth missing (living people)
20th-century American businesspeople
21st-century American businesspeople
20th-century American businesswomen
21st-century American businesswomen